Gräfenberg is a Franconian town in the district of Forchheim, in Bavaria, Germany. It is situated 16km southeast of Forchheim and 25km northeast of Nuremberg.

Location
Gräfenberg is located in the southern part of Little Switzerland.
The town is characterised by a great range of elevation (from 400 to 550 metres).
A brook, the Kalkach, flows through the town with a steep drop.

Gräfenberg is divided into 16 districts:
The town Gräfenberg
Lilling
Hohenschwärz
Kasberg
Walkersbrunn
Dörnhof
Thuisbrunn
Höfles
Sollenberg
Rangen
Haidhof
Schlichenreuth
Guttenburg
Neusles
Lillinger Höhe
Gräfenberger Hüll

Pictures

Religion
Gräfenberg is a majority Protestant town; even so, some districts (Lilling, Sollenberg) are majority Catholic.

History
Gräfenberg was first mentioned in the year 1172. From 1333 onward the patrician family Haller reigned in Gräfenberg. In 1371 King Karl IV granted the market municipal law. In 1567 a fire destroyed the parts of town located back of the walls. In 1778 a flood wave, resulting from heavy rainfalls, killed six people. With the Reichsdeputationshauptschluss in 1803 the town became part of Bavaria. In the Austro-Prussian War between the German Confederation (which included Bavaria), and Prussia and her allies, the town was the headquarters of the Prussian army at the time that the ceasefire between Bavaria and Prussia was declared in 1866.

In the 1960s and 1970s the other districts of Gräfenberg became part of the borough: for example Lilling (first mentioned 1205) and Thuisbrunn (first mentioned 1007).

Local council
Local elections were held on March 15, 2020 with the following results:
 Christian Social Union in Bavaria 4 seats
 Alliance '90/The Greens 2 seats
 Free voters Bavaria 5 seats
 Social Democratic Party of Germany 3 seats
 Gräfenberg citizens (GBL) 2 seats

Mayors
Ralf Kunzmann (Free Voters Bavaria) is the mayor since May 1, 2020. He won the election on March 29, 2020 against his predecessor Hans-Jürgen Nekolla (SPD) with 52,55 % of the vote.

References

External links

Forchheim (district)